Buchema bellula is a species of sea snail, a marine gastropod mollusk in the family of Horaiclavidae.

It was formerly included within the family Turridae.

Description
The size of the fusiform shell varies between 6 mm and 8.5 mm, its diameter is 3.4 mm. The shell contains 8 whorls of which the first two in the protoconch. The aperture spans about ⅓ of the whole length. The sinus is of mediocre size. The siphonal canal is very short and recurved to the left. The white band encircling the whorls includes three of the spiral lirations which are thickened upon the obsolete ribs. In fact, each rib might be said to be composed of the thickening of the lirae.

Distribution
This marine species occurs in the Caribbean Sea off Guadeloupe, Saint Vincent and Aruba

References

External links
  Tucker, J.K. 2004 Catalog of recent and fossil turrids (Mollusca: Gastropoda). Zootaxa 682:1–1295.
 Fallon, Phillip J , Descriptions and illustrations of some new and poorly known turrids of the tropical northwestern Atlantic. Part 1. Genera Buchema Corea, 1934 and Miraclathurella Woodring, 1928 (Gastropoda: Turridae: Crassispirinae); Nautilus 124, 2010
 
 Specimen at MNHN, Paris

bellula
Gastropods described in 1882